This page is about natural hot spring near the First Nations community of Skatin 50 kilometres south of Pemberton Pemberton, British Columbia.  For the town and associated rapids in the East Kootenay see Skookumchuck, British Columbia; for the saltwater rapids at the mouth of Sechelt Inlet see Skookumchuck Narrows. For other uses see Skookumchuck (disambiguation).

Skookumchuck Hot Springs is a thermal spring in British Columbia. Its pre-colonial Native and preferred name is Tsek Hot Spring or T'sek Hot Spring. The former name is Saint Agnes Well. The springs are located near the First Nation community of Skookumchuck (Former name on older maps) and more recently renamed /reverted to traditional name of Skatin ("ska-TEEN")  is on the historic Harrison Lillooet Gold Rush trail in the Lillooet River valley, south of Lillooet Lake, in British Columbia, Canada.

The hot springs themselves, named Tsek in the St'at'imcets language (pronounced "chick") were on private property purchased from "Goodwin Purcell" family by the Trethewey family after his death in the 1909 and acquired by the Government of Canada in 2008 to be held in trust for the local aboriginal people until a potential treaty settlement.

Tsek Hot Springs, formally known as Skookumchuck Hot Springs was also known as Saint Agnes Well during the days of the Fraser Canyon Gold Rush and the Douglas Road, along which it is located, while Harrison Hot Springs farther south was known as St. Alice's Well; both were named by Justice Bailey for the daughters of Governor Douglas.

Near the community formerly named Skookumchuck -now reverted & renamed  Skatin were road houses known as "18 Mile House" or "20 Mile House", a reference to its distance from Port Douglas, at the Douglas Road's commencement at the head of Harrison Lake.

An Oblate mission was established  in the 1860s  and under direction of the priests, the native community began to build a village at Skookumchuck, about 4 kilometres south of the hot springs.  As settling progressed, the Stl'itl'imx people built a striking Carpenter Gothic/ Wood Gothic church in 1908, which was designated a National Historic Site of Canada in 1981, and remains standing and in use today, the Church of the Holy Cross. A prominent feature are the simple but elegant stained red & blue glass windows (see Skatin for details).

The hot springs are managed by members of the Skatin community; camping is available for a fee.  Many local families still use the hot springs, and visitors are asked to respect local family values, be discreet in language and behaviour, and to wait until children have finished bathing before entering the hot tubs.

Road improved most of the way. In the Spring of 2015 dirt In-SHUCK-ch Forest Service Road / FSR was widened from 1 to 1  1/2 lanes to 2 lanes + two 1/2 lane shoulders (i.e. 3 lanes) for the whole length of Lillooet Lake. The Last section is still rough.

References

BCGNIS listing "Skookumchuck (locality)"
BCGNIS listing "Tsek (springs)"
BCGNIS listing "Harrison Hot Springs"

Populated places in the Fraser Valley Regional District
Lillooet Country
Sea-to-Sky Corridor
St'at'imc
Indian reserves in British Columbia
Unincorporated settlements in British Columbia
Hot springs of British Columbia